Kannel may refer to:
Kannel (telecommunications), an open source Wireless Application Protocol (WAP) and Short Message Service (SMS) gateway for UNIX operating systems.
Kannel (instrument), an Estonian zither similar to the Finnish kantele

People 
 Astrid Kannel (born 1967), Estonian television journalist
 Theophilus Van Kannel (1841–1919), American who invented the revolving door

Estonian-language surnames